George Main may refer to:
 George Washington Main (1807–1836), Alamo defender
 George Main (horse racing) (1879–1948), Australian pastoralist and horse breeder
 George Main (rugby league), Australian rugby league footballer